This list of prehistoric malacostracans illustrates the genera from the fossil record that have ever been considered to be malacostracans, a class of crustacean arthropod, excluding purely vernacular terms. The list includes all commonly accepted genera, but also genera that are now considered invalid, doubtful (nomina dubia), or were not formally published (nomina nuda), as well as junior synonyms of more established names, and genera that are no longer considered malacostracans. The majority of the genera are from the order Decapoda, for which a recent synopsis allows invalid names to be excluded.

Order Decapoda

Suborder Dendrobranchiata

Acanthochirana
Aeger
Albertoppelia
Ambilobeia
Antrimpos
Archeosolenocera
Benthesicymus
Bombur
Bylgia
Carinacaris
Carpopenaeus
Cretapenaeus
Cretasergestes
Drobna
Dusa
Hakelocaris
Ifasya
Koelga
Libanocaris
Longichela
Longitergite
Macropenaeus
Microchela
Micropenaeus
Paleomattea
Penaeus
Pseudobombur
Pseudodusa
Rauna
Rhodanicaris
Satyrocaris
Sicyonia

Infraorder Stenopodidea
Jilinicaris
Phoenice

Infraorder Caridea

Acanthinopus
Alburnia
Alcmonacaris
Bannikovia
Bechleja
Beurlenia
Blaculla
Buergerocaris
Caridina
Crangon
Delclosia
Gampsurus
Harthofia
Hefriga
Leiothorax
Micropsalis
Morscrangon
Notostomus
Odontochelion
Oplophorus
Palaemon
Pandalus
Parvocaris
Pasiphaea
Pinnacaris
Pleopteryx
Propalaemon
Pseudocaridinella
Schmelingia
Tonellocaris
Udora
Udorella
Yongjiacaris

Infraorder Astacidea

Astacopsis
Astacus
Austropotamobius
Chilenophoberus
Cricoidoscelosus
Homarus
Hoploparia
Jagtia
Lammuastacus
Malmuncina
Metanephrops
Nephrops
Nephropsis
Oncopareia
Pacifastacus
Palaeocambarus
Palaeoechinastacus
Palaeonephrops
Palaeopalaemon
Palaeophoberus
Paraclythia
Paranephrops
Procambarus
Protastacus
Pseudastacus
Pseudohomarus
Stenochirus
Tillocheles
Uncina

Infraorder Glypheidea

Cedrillosia
Chimaerastacus
Clytiella
Clytiopsis
Enoploclytia
Eryma
Galicia
Glaessnericaris
Glyphea
Huhatanka
Jabaloya
Lissocardia
Litogaster
Mecochirus
Meyeria
Palaeastacus
Paraclytiopsis
Paralitogaster
Pemphix
Platychela
Platypleon
Praeatya
Protoclytiopsis
Pseudoglyphea
Pseudopemphix
Pustulina
Selenisca
Sinopemphix
Squamosoglyphea
Stenodactylina
Trachysoma

Infraorder Thalassinidea

Axiopsis
Axius
Brecanclawu
Callianassa
Callianopsis
Calliax
Callichirus
Comoxianassa
Corallianassa
Cowichianassa
Ctenocheles
Eoglypturus
Etallonia
Eucalliax
Glypturus
Gourretia
Huxleycaris
Jaxea
Laomedia
Laurentiella
Lepidophthalmus
Magila
Megachela
Melipal
Neocallichirus
Neotrypaea
Nihonotrypaea
Paki
Podocallichirus
Protaxius
Protocallianassa
Schlueteria
Sergio
Thalassina
Trypaea
Upogebia
Vegarthron

Infraorder Achelata

Archaeocarabus
Archaeopalinurus
Astacodes
Biarctus
Cancrinos
Jasus
Justitia
Linuparus
Palaeopalinurus
Palibacus
Palinurina
Palinurus
Panulirus
Parribacus
Pehuenchia
Scyllarella
Scyllarides
Scyllarus
Tricarina

Infraorder Polychelida

Antarcticheles
Coleia
Cycleryon
Eryon
Hasaracancer
Hellerocaris
Knebelia
Palaeopentacheles
Proeryon
Pseudocoleia
Rosenfeldia
Tetrachela
Tropifer
Willemoesiocaris

Infraorder Anomura

Acanthogalathea
Albunea
Ammopylocheles
Anapagurus
Annieporcellana
Annuntidiogenes
Austromunida
Beripetrolisthes
Birgus
Brazilomunida
Calcinus
Calteagalathea
Ciliopagurus
Clibanarius
Coenobita
Cretagalathea
Dardanus
Diacanthurus
Diogenes
Eocalcinus
Eocarcinus
Eomunidopsis
Eopaguropsis
Eopetrolisthes
Eotylaspis
Eumunida
Faxegalathea
Galathea
Gastrosacus
Goniochirus
Harryhausenia
Haumuriaegla
Italialbunea
Jurapylocheles
Lessinigalathea
Lobipetrolisthes
Longoporcellana
Lophomastix
Lophoraninella
Luisogalathea
Mesogalathea
Mesoparapylocheles
Munida
Munidopsis
Munitheites
Orhomalus
Ovocarcinus
Pachycheles
Paguristes
Pagurus
Palaeomunida
Palaeomunidopsis
Palaeopagurus
Paragalathea
Paralomis
Parapaguristes
Petrochirus
Petrolisthes
Pisidia
Platykotta
Polyonyx
Porcellana
Porcellanoidea
Praealbunea
Pristinaspina
Protaegla
Protomunida
Pylopagurus
Retrorsichela
Shinkaia
Spathagalathea
Stemonopa
Striadiogenes
Zygopa

Infraorder Brachyura

Abyssophthalmus
Acanthocarpus
Acanthodiaulax
Acantholambrus
Acanthoportunus
Achaeus
Actaea
Actaeites
Actaeodes
Actaeops
Actaeopsis
Actinotocarcinus
Actumnus
Ameridromia
Ampliura
Amydrocarcinus
Anaglyptus
Anatolikos
Andorina
Anisospinos
Antarctidromia
Antarctomithrax
Araripecarcinus
Arcania
Archaeocypoda
Archaeogeryon
Archaeoplax
Archaeopus
Archaeotetra
Archaeozius
Arenaeus
Arges
Ashtoret
Asthenognathus
Atelecyclus
Atergatis
Aulacopodia
Austrohelice
Avitelmessus
Balcacarcinus
Banareia
Baricarcinus
Bartethusa
Basinotopus
Bicarinocarcinus
Bicornisranina
Binkhorstia
Bittnereus
Bittnerilia
Boschettia
Brachynotus
Branchiocarcinus
Branchiolambrus
Branchioplax
Brome
Bucculentum
Budapanopeus
Calappa
Calappella
Calappilia
Callinectes
Caloxanthus
Camarocarcinus
Campylostoma
Cancer
Cancrixantho
Caprocancer
Carcineretes
Carcinoplax
Carcinus
Cardirhynchus
Cardisoma
Carinocarcinoides
Carinocarcinus
Carpilius
Carupa
Cenocorystes
Cenomanocarcinus
Ceronnectes
Chaceon
Charybdis
Chasmocarcinus
Cherpiocarcinus
Chirinocarcinus
Chlinocephalus
Chlorodiella
Chorilia
Cicarnus
Coeloma
Coelopus
Collinsius
Colneptunus
Colpocaris
Componocancer
Corallicarcinus
Corazzatocarcinus
Corystes
Costacopluma
Cretachlorodius
Cretacocarcinus
Cretacoranina
Cristafrons
Cristella
Cristipluma
Cronius
Crossotonotus
Cryptodromia
Cryptolutea
Cryptosoma
Cyamocarcinus
Cyclocancer
Cyclocorystes
Cyclodius
Cycloes
Cyclograpsus
Cycloprosopon
Cyclothyreus
Cycloxanthops
Cymonomus
Cyrtorhina
Dagnaudus
Daira
Dakoticancer
Daldorfia
Daragrapsus
Daranyia
Demania
Derilambrus
Diaulax
Dioratiopus
Distefania
Doerflesia
Dorippe
Drachiella
Dromia
Dromidia
Dromilites
Dromiopsis
Duncania
Dynomene
Dynomenopsis
Ebalia
Ekalakia
Enoplolambrus
Enoplonotus
Eocarpilius
Eocharybdis
Eodorippe
Eodromites
Eohalimede
Eoinachoides
Eomaldivia
Eomatuta
Eopalicus
Eopilumnus
Eoplax
Eoprosopon
Eotrachynotocarcinus
Eoxanthias
Epialtus
Epigodromia
Epixanthus
Eriocheir
Eriosachila
Eriphia
Ethusa
Etisus
Etyus
Etyxanthosia
Euclosia
Eucorystes
Eucrate
Eumorphactaea
Eumorphocorystes
Euphylax
Euprognatha
Euronectes
Eurycarpus
Euryozius
Eurypanopeus
Euryplax
Eurytium
Euxanthus
Falconoplax
Falsiportunites
Feldmannia
Forestia
Fredericia
Gabriella
Gaillardiellus
Galene
Galenopsis
Garthiope
Gastrodorus
Gecchelicarcinus
Gemmacarcinus
Gemmellarocarcinus
Geothelphusa
Gillcarcinus
Glabropilumnus
Glaessneropsis
Glebocarcinus
Globihexapus
Glyphithyreus
Glyptodynomene
Glyptoxanthus
Gollincarcinus
Gomezinus
Goneplax
Goniochele
Goniocypoda
Goniodromites
Graptocarcinus
Guinotosia
Halimede
Harenacorystes
Harpactocarcinus
Harpactoxanthopsis
Haydnella
Hebertides
Heeia
Heikeopsis
Hemigrapsus
Hemioon
Hepatella
Hepatinulus
Hepatiscus
Hepatus
Herbstia
Heteractaea
Heteronucia
Heteropanope
Heus
Hexapanopeus
Hexapus
Hillius
Holcocarcinus
Homelys
Homola
Homoliformis
Homolodromia
Homolopsis
Hoplitocarcinus
Hyas
Hyastenus
Hypocolpus
Ibericancer
Icriocarcinus
Ilia
Iliacantha
Inachus
Iphiculus
Ixa
Jacquinotia
Jakobsenius
Jonesius
Karasawaia
Kerepesia
Kierionopsis
Kowaicarcinus
Kromtitis
Lachnopodus
Laevicarcinus
Laeviprosopon
Laleonectes
Lambropsis
Lathahypossia
Latheticocarcinus
Latulambrus
Lecythocaris
Leiolambrus
Leptodius
Leptomithrax
Lessinioplax
Leucosia
Leucosilia
Leurocyclus
Levicyclus
Liagore
Lianira
Libinia
Libystes
Lignihomola
Liocarcinus
Liocaris
Liomera
Lipaesthesius
Lissocarcinus
Lissopsis
Lithophylax
Litograpsus
Lobocarcinus
Lobogalenopsis
Lobonotus
Lobulata
Loerentheya
Loerenthopluma
Londinimola
Longodromites
Longusorbis
Lophopanopeus
Lophoranina
Lovarina
Loxorhynchus
Lucanthonisia
Lupeites
Lupocyclus
Lydia
Lyreidina
Lyreidus
Macroacaena
Macrocheira
Macromedaeus
Macrophthalmus
Macropipus
Maeandricampus
Magyarcarcinus
Maingrapsus
Mainhepatiscus
Maja
Marocarcinus
Martinetta
Martinocarcinus
Marycarcinus
Mascaranada
Matutites
Maurimia
Medaeops
Medaeus
Medorippe
Megamia
Megaxantho
Megokkos
Menippe
Mesodromilites
Mesolambrus
Mesorhoea
Metacarcinus
Metopograpsus
Metopoxantho
Micippa
Microcorystes
Microdium
Micromaia
Micromithrax
Micropanope
Minohellenus
Miocyclus
Miograpsus
Miopipus
Mioplax
Miosesarma
Mioxaiva
Mithracia
Mithracites
Mithraculus
Mithrax
Monodaeus
Montezumella
Mursia
Mursilata
Mursilia
Mursiopsis
Myra
Nanocassiope
Nanomaja
Nanoplax
Necora
Necrocarcinus
Necronectes
Nemausa
Neodorippe
Neoliomera
Neomeria
Neosarmatium
Neozanthopsis
Neptocarcinus
Nipponopon
Nitotacarcinus
Nobilum
Nodoprosopon
Noetlingia
Nogarolia
Notocarcinus
Notomithrax
Notopocorystes
Notopoides
Notopus
Notosceles
Nucia
Nucilobus
Nursia
Ocalina
Ocypode
Oedisoma
Olinaecaris
Ommatocarcinus
Oonoton
Ophthalmoplax
Orbitoplax
Oregonia
Orithopsis
Orthakrolophos
Osachila
Ovalipes
Ovamene
Oxythyreus
Ozius
Pachygrapsus
Pakicarcinus
Palaeocarpilius
Palaeodromites
Palaeograpsus
Palaeomyra
Palaeopinnixa
Palaeopsopheticus
Palaeotrichia
Palaeoxantho
Palaeoxanthops
Palaeoxanthopsis
Palehomola
Palicus
Palmyria
Panopeus
Panticarcinus
Paracleistostoma
Paracorallicarcinus
Paractaea
Paracyclois
Paradorippe
Paradoxicarcinus
Paranecrocarcinus
Paranursia
Paraocalina
Parapirimela
Paratetralia
Parathranites
Paratumidocarcinus
Paraverrucoides
Paraxanthias
Paraxanthosia
Pariphiculus
Paromola
Paromolopsis
Parthenope
Peloeus
Periacanthus
Persephona
Phalangites
Philyra
Phlyctenodes
Phrynolambrus
Pilodius
Pilumnomimus
Pilumnopeus
Pilumnus
Pinnixa
Pinnotheres
Pirimela
Pisa
Pisoides
Pisomaja
Pitho
Pithonoton
Plagiophthalmus
Planes
Planoprosopon
Platepistoma
Platylambrus
Platypodia
Pleolobites
Pliopirimela
Podocatactes
Podophthalmus
Polycnemidium
Pororaria
Portufuria
Portumnus
Portunites
Portunus
Potamon
Potamonautes
Preclarocarcinus
Pregeryona
Prehepatus
Priabonella
Priabonocarcinus
Prochlorodius
Prohomola
Prosopon
Proterocarcinus
Protuberosa
Proxicarpilius
Psammocarcinus
Psammograpsus
Pseudoachelous
Pseudocarcinus
Pseudodaranyia
Pseudohepatiscus
Pseudomicippe
Pseudonecrocarcinus
Pseudophilyra
Pseudophlyctenodes
Pseudorhombila
Psopheticus
Psygmophthalmus
Pterocarcinus
Pugettia
Pulalius
Pyromaia
Quasilaeviranina
Rakosia
Randallia
Ranidina
Ranilia
Raniliformis
Ranina
Raninella
Raninoides
Rathbunella
Rathbunopon
Remia
Retrocypoda
Retropluma
Rhachiosoma
Rhinodromia
Rhinolambrus
Rhinopoupinia
Rocacarcinus
Rochinia
Roemerus
Rogueus
Romaleon
Rugafarius
Sabahranina
Sabellidromites
Sandomingia
Santeecarcinus
Santeella
Santeexanthus
Sarahcarcinus
Saratunus
Schizophroida
Schizophrys
Sculptoplax
Scylla
Scyra
Secretanella
Seorsus
Sereneopeus
Serenius
Sesarma
Sestrostoma
Sharnia
Shazella
Silvacarcinus
Simonellia
Sodakus
Speleophorus
Speocarcinus
Spinipalicus
Stenocionops
Stenodromia
Stenorhynchus
Stephanometopon
Stevea
Stintonius
Stoaplax
Styrioplax
Sylviocarcinus
Symethis
Syphax
Szaboa
Tanidromites
Tanzanonautes
Tasadia
Tehuacana
Telamonocarcinus
Teleophrys
Tenuihomola
Tepexicarcinus
Tetracarcinus
Tetralia
Tetraxanthus
Thalamita
Thalamitoides
Thelecarcinus
Thelphusograpsus
Thia
Thoe
Titanocarcinus
Titanodorippe
Tithonohomola
Tokoyo
Tongapapaka
Torynomma
Trachynotocarcinus
Trachypirimela
Trapezia
Trechmannius
Tribolocephalus
Trichopeltarion
Tritodynamia
Tumidocarcinus
Tutankhamen
Tutus
Tylocarcinus
Tymolus
Typhlocarcinus
Typilobus
Uca
Uhlias
Umalia
Urnalana
Utica
Vanuachela
Vectis
Verrucarcinus
Verrucoides
Viacarcinus
Viaophthalmus
Viapinnixa
Viaplax
Wanga
Wilmingtonia
Wilsonimaia
Withersella
Woodbinax
Wulaicarcinus
Xaiva
Xandaros
Xanthias
Xanthilites
Xantho
Xanthodius
Xanthosia
Xanthosioides
Xeinostoma
Xenophthalmus
Zanthopsis
Zaops
Zosimus
Zygastrocarcinus

Order Aeschronectida

Aenigmacaris
Aratidecthes
Crangopsis
Joanellia
Kallidecthes

Order Amphipoda
Gammarus
Melita
Praegmelina

Order Angustidontida 
 Angustidontus
 Schramidontus

Order Archaeostraca
 

Aristozoe
Baituganocaris
Callizoe
Caryocaris
Ceratiocaris
Dictyocaris
Dilophaspis
Dithyrocaris
Echinocaris
Eleutherocaris
Elymocaris
Gonatocaris
Guerichicaris
Hebertocaris
Heroldina
Kerfornecaris
Lebesconteia
Macrocaris
Montecaris
Nahecaris
Ohiocaris
Orozoe
Pephricaris
Ptychocaris
Pygocaris
Rhinocaris
Schugurocaris
Trigonocarys
Tropidocaris

Order Belotelsonidea
Belotelson

Order Cumacea
Nannastacus
Palaeocuma

Order Eocaridacea
Anthracophausia
Devonocaris
Eocaris
Essoidea
Palaemysis

Order Hoplostraca
Kellibrookia
Sairocaris

Order Hymenostraca
Hymenocaris

Order Isopoda

Anhelkocephalon
Archaeoniscus
Archaeosphaeroma
Cirolana
Cyclosphaeroma
Cymatoga
Cymodoce
Elioserolis
Eocopea
Eosphaeroma
Hesslerella
Heterosphaeroma
Isopodites
Palaega
Palaeocrangon
Palaeophreatoicus
Proidotea
Protamphisopus
Protosphaeroma
Saduria
Sphaeroma
Triassphaeroma
Unusuropode
Urda

Order Leptostraca
Rhabdouraea

Order Lophogastrida
Eucopia
Lophogaster
Peachocaris
Schimperella

Order Mysidacea

Anthracaris
Bellocaris
Elder
Francocaris
Jerometichenoria
Mamayocaris
Notocaris
Paramysis
Paulocaris
Pseudogalathea
Pseudotealliocaris
Pygocephalus
Siriella
Tylerocaris

Order Palaeostomatopoda
Archaeocaris
Bairdops
Eopteridium

Phyllocarida incertae sedis
Aptychopsis
Discinocaris
Peltocaris
Protocimex

Order Stomatopoda

Angelosquilla
Bathysquilla
Chloridella
Gonodactylus
Gorgonophontes
Hemisquilla
Lysiosquilla
Palaeosquilla
Perimecturus
Pseudosculda
Pseudosquilla
Sculda
Squilla
Topangasquilla
Tyrannophontes

Order Tanaidacea

Acadiocaris
Anthracocaris
Carlclausus
Cretitanais
Eucryptocaris
Jurapseudes
Ophthalmapseudes
Palaeotanais

Order Waterstonellidea
Waterstonella

See also

 List of prehistoric barnacles
 List of prehistoric brittle stars
 List of prehistoric sea cucumbers
 List of crinoid genera

References

 list of
Lists of prehistoric arthropods